Ceanothus papillosus, the wartleaf ceanothus, is a species of plant in the genus Ceanothus. It is endemic to California, where it grows in open habitat on the slopes of the coastal mountain ranges, such as woodland and chaparral.

Description
The evergreen leaves are alternately arranged, often in crowded clusters, each oblong to long-rectangular in shape and covered in glandular bumps. The edges are generally turned under and lined with glandular hairs. The inflorescence is a cluster of bright blue flowers. The fruit is a bumpy capsule about 3 millimeters long.

References

External links
Calflora Database: Ceanothus papillosus (wartleaf ceanothus)
Jepson Manual Treatment
USDA Plants Profile
Photo gallery

papillosus
Endemic flora of California
Natural history of the California chaparral and woodlands
Natural history of the California Coast Ranges
Natural history of the Peninsular Ranges
Natural history of the San Francisco Bay Area
Natural history of the Transverse Ranges
Taxa named by Asa Gray
Taxa named by John Torrey